Malcolm Burn (born October 4, 1960) is a Canadian-born music producer, recording engineer and musician. Emmylou Harris's Red Dirt Girl, produced by Burn, won Best Contemporary Folk Album at the 2001 Grammys.

Biography
Born in Cornwall, Ontario, Burn grew up in Deep River, Ontario and became lead singer/keyboardist for the 1980s Canadian band Boys Brigade. Following the dissolution of that group, he turned towards music production and solo work.

In 1988 Burn relocated to New Orleans where he would work with Daniel Lanois (known for his work with U2 & Peter Gabriel) on a number of projects. Their collaboration began with Burn playing keyboards and guitar on Lanois' solo debut record Acadie. Burn recorded again with Lanois for Bob Dylan on his acclaimed album Oh Mercy, and on Yellow Moon by The Neville Brothers and Living with the Law, which he co-produced for Chris Whitley.

Burn produced projects with Blue Rodeo, Emmylou Harris (Red Dirt Girl, Stumble into Grace), Midnight Oil (Breathe), Patty Griffin, Crash Vegas (Red Earth) and Patti Smith (Gone Again).

Burn continues to produce, record and write music. He is making a documentary film tentatively entitled Touched about a group home for mentally ill people in Kingston, New York.

Awards and recognition
2001: Winner - Grammy Award for Best Contemporary Folk Album, with Jim Watts (engineer) and Emmylou Harris for Red Dirt Girl
2004: Nominee - Juno Award for "Producer of the Year" for "Here I Am" / "I Will Dream", Emmylou Harris

Discography

Solo
1983 - Boys Brigade (Anthem/Capitol Records) - album produced by Geddy Lee of Rush
1988 - Redemption
1996 - After Dinner Mints (Handsome Boy Records) - under band name: Pregnant

Producer/musician
1982 - Blue Peter - "Chinese Graffiti" from Up To You (keyboards) 
1988 - Daniel Lanois - Acadie (recorded and co-written/mix)
1988 - Crash Vegas - Red Earth (produced and recorded/mix)
1988 - Blue Rodeo - Diamond Mine (co-producer/mix)
1989 - Bob Dylan - Oh Mercy (engineer/musician/mix)
1989 - The Neville Brothers - Yellow Moon (recorded/musician/mix)
1990 - Chris Whitley - Living with the Law (producer/musician/mix)
1991 - The Neville Brothers - Brothers Keeper (producer/musician/mix)
1992 - Daniel Lanois - For the Beauty of Wynona (musician/engineer/mix)
1992 - The Devlins - Drift (producer/musician)
1992 - Lisa Germano - Happiness (producer/musician)
1993 - Iggy Pop - American Caesar (producer/musician)
1993 - John Mellencamp - Human Wheels (co-producer)
1994 - Giant Sand - Glum (producer/musician)
1994 - Charlie Sexton Sextet - Under the Wishing Tree (producer/musician/mix)
1994 - Junkhouse - Strays (co-producer/musician)
1995 - Junkhouse - Birthday Boy (producer/engineer/musician)
1996 - Midnight Oil - Breathe (producer/musician)
1996 - Patti Smith - "Gone Again" (producer)
1997 - Archie Roach - Looking For Butterboy (producer/musician)
1998 - Astrid - Boy For You (producer/musician)
1998 - Better Than Ezra - How Does Your Garden Grow? (producer/engineer/mix)
1998 - Sinéad Lohan - No Mermaid (producer/engineer/musician)
1999 - Emmylou Harris - Red Dirt Girl (producer/engineer/musician)
2000 - The Normals - Coming to Life (producer/mix)
2001 - Luthea Salom - Out Of Without (producer/engineer/musician)
2003 - Rachael Yamagata - Rachael Yamagata EP (producer/musician)
2005 - Chris Whitley - Soft Dangerous Shores (producer/recorded/musician)
2007 - Luthea Salom - Sunbeam Surrounded By Winter (producer/engineer/musician)
2008 - A Fragile Tomorrow - Beautiful Noise (producer/recorded/musician)
2008 - Kaki King - Dreaming of Revenge (producer)
2009 - The Bowmans -The Bowmans (producer/engineer)
2009 - Sandrine -Dark Fades Into Light (producer/engineer)
2010 - Amilia Spicer - (mixer)
2011 - Richard Buckner - Our Blood - (mixer)
2011 - The Caught (In the Madness) Malcolm Burn-Producer, Engineer, Guitar, keyboards, vocals,  
2013 - Gérald de Palmas - De Palmas -  (producer)
2013 - Jill Cohn - Yellow Rose - (producer/musician)
2013 - The Grahams - Rivermans Daughter - (producer/musician/mixer)
2014 - Hubertus Roesch - Waiting For This Train - (producer/musician/mixer)
2014 - Dan Whitley - Calling all Gods - (producer/engineer)
2019 - Ted Wulfers - Tremolo Moon (mixer)
2022 - Halfway (band) - On the Ghostline with Hands of Lightning - (producer/musician/mix)

References

External links
Malcolm Burn official website
MySpace site
Boys Brigade at canadianbands.com (references Malcolm Burn)
Octopus Media: Malcolm Burn profile
 

Canadian record producers
Canadian rock singers
Canadian folk singer-songwriters
Canadian male singer-songwriters
Canadian audio engineers
Living people
People from Renfrew County
1960 births
Grammy Award winners
Canadian new wave musicians
People from Cornwall, Ontario
Anthem Records artists